Dr. Ahrendt's Decision is an East German black-and-white film, directed by Frank Vogel. It was released in 1960.

Plot
Dr. Ahrendt developed a new model of an iron smelter. When his invention fails to produce the required results, he begins to doubt himself, and is even considered as a liar by some. However, the workers in the factory are determined to achieve the goals set forth, and together with the scientist they manage to prove that the machine can be used as planned.

Cast
 Johannes Arpe as Dr. Heinrich Ahrendt
 Rudolf Ulrich as Martin Kröger
 Willi Schrade as Andreas Morgner
 Erika Radtke as Gisela Ahrendt
 Josef Stauder as Karl Szepinski
 Fritz Diez as Scholz
 Gisela May as Mrs. Kröger
 Fritz H. Kirchhoff as Dr. Maurer
 Paul Streckfuß	as Kurt
 Werner Lierck as Rudi
 Hans Klering as Franz
 Roman Silberstein as Ede
 Helga Göring as Irma
 Hans Hardt-Hardtloff as Erwin
 Hans Flössel as Musner
 Siegfried Weiß as Kripphahn

Production
The film was one of the so-called "mission films", commissioned in great number by the East German government during the late 1950s and the early 1960s, that were intended to promote distinct political aims. Dr. Ahrendt's Decision was meant to set an ideal model for behavior and attitude for the industrial workers.

Reception
Heinz Kersten wrote that the film resembled Socialist Realist pictures, and was intended to promote the economical aspirations of East Germany, by motivating the populace to work harder.

Marianne Lange noted that Dr. Ahrendt's Decision portrayed the transformation of simple workers to ambitious, skilled labor. The West German film service regarded it as "boring propaganda".

References

External links
 
 Die Entscheidung des Dr. Ahrendt on PROGRESS' website.

1960 films
East German films
1960s German-language films
German black-and-white films
1960s German films